The 1958 New Mexico gubernatorial election took place on November 4, 1958, in order to elect the Governor of New Mexico. Incumbent Republican Edwin L. Mechem ran for reelection to a second term.

Democratic primary
The Democratic primary was won by state representative John Burroughs. Former Attorney General Robert C. Dow unsuccessfully sought the nomination.

Results

Republican primary
The Republican primary was won by incumbent governor Edwin L. Mechem.

Results

General election

Results

References

1958
gubernatorial
New Mexico
November 1958 events in the United States